The Sahara Elite League (also known as Zonal League) was a four team cricket competition created by Cricket Kenya featuring a Twenty20 tournament, a one day cricket tournament and finally a three-day cricket tournament.  For the inaugural league four teams will be competing consisting of the 60 best players according to Cricket Kenya from Kenya.

Tournament history
The first, and what was to be the only, edition of the competition involved four franchises, the Northern Nomads, the Eastern Aces, the Southern Stars, and the Western Chiefs. The teams were captained by National team players, Steve Tikolo, Thomas Odoyo, Kennedy Obuya, and Peter Ongondo 2008. The inaugural T20 Competition, played in February 2008, was won by the Eastern Aces, while the first 50 over competition was won by the Northern Nomads, However the 3 day format of the competition was postponed due to unfavourable weather and is set to be played in June 2008. Further difficulties in availability of players, many of whom were in school, meant that the first season of the three-dayers had to be compressed to two days a match.
The league was sponsored by South African, Sahara Computers, African Cricket Association and others.

Squads

Results

Three-day matches

References 

Kenyan domestic cricket competitions
2008 in Kenya
2008 in cricket